Union Bay may refer to:

Places
 Union Bay (Alaska), US
 Union Bay (Seattle), a part of Lake Washington, Washington state, US
 Union Bay, British Columbia, a community in Canada

Other uses
 Union Bay (platform), Intel's platform for the Cannon Lake die shrink of the Skylake microarchitecture